Rocky Spruit is a village in the province of Mashonaland East, Zimbabwe.

Populated places in Mashonaland East Province